Eric James Bessell (6 June 1923 – 10 March 1979) was an Australian politician. Born in Launceston, Tasmania, he was a pastoralist before serving in the Australian Army as a private during World War II. He served as President of the Tasmanian Liberal Party in 1966 and 1973. In 1974, he was elected to the Australian Senate as a Liberal Senator for Tasmania. He was defeated in 1975 after being demoted to sixth place on the ballot paper to make way for real estate agent Brian Archer and nurse Shirley Walters. Bessell died in 1979.

References

Liberal Party of Australia members of the Parliament of Australia
Members of the Australian Senate for Tasmania
Members of the Australian Senate
1923 births
1979 deaths
20th-century Australian politicians
Australian Army personnel of World War II
Australian Army soldiers